The men's doubles tournament at the 1993 Australian Open was held from 16 through 29 January 1993 on the outdoor hard courts at the Flinders Park in Melbourne, Australia. Danie Visser and Laurie Warder won the title, defeating John Fitzgerald and Anders Järryd in the final.

Seeds

Draw

Finals

Top half

Section 1

Section 2

Bottom half

Section 3

Section 4

External links
 1993 Australian Open – Men's draws and results at the International Tennis Federation

Men's Doubles
Australian Open (tennis) by year – Men's doubles